The following is a list of portrait drawings by Hans Holbein the Younger that are generally accepted as by his own hand.

Royal Collection

Kunstmuseum Basel

See also
 List of paintings by Hans Holbein the Younger

Notes

References
  Internet Archive preview
 
 
 
 
 
  google books preview
  google books preview
 
 
 
 google books preview
  google books preview
 
 
  google books preview
  google books preview
  google books preview
 
 
  google books preview
  google books preview
  google books preview
 
 
 
 
 
 
 
  google books preview
  google books preview

External links
 

Holbein,Hans the Younger
 
Holbein